Florica Lavric (7 January 1962 – 20 June 2014) was a Romanian rower. Competing in coxed fours she won an Olympic gold medal in 1984 and world championship silver medals in 1983 and 1985. In 1987 she contracted meningitis and retired from competitions. She died from lung cancer aged 52.

References

External links 
 
 
 

1962 births
2014 deaths
Romanian female rowers
Rowers at the 1984 Summer Olympics
Olympic gold medalists for Romania
Olympic rowers of Romania
Olympic medalists in rowing
Deaths from cancer in Romania
Deaths from lung cancer
Medalists at the 1984 Summer Olympics
World Rowing Championships medalists for Romania